The 1924 West Virginia gubernatorial election was held on November 4, 1924, to elect the governor of West Virginia. Attorney General Edward T. England and Secretary of State Houston G. Young unsuccessfully ran for the Republican nomination.

Results

References

1924
gubernatorial
West Virginia
November 1924 events